"I Could Be the One" is a 2012 single by Avicii and Nicky Romero.

I Could Be the One may also refer to:

 "I Could Be the One" (Donna Lewis song), 1998
 "I Could Be the One" (Stacie Orrico song), 2004
 "I Could Be the One", Marti Webb song from the musical The Card

See also
 Be the One (disambiguation)
 Could You Be the One? (disambiguation)